Józef Gładysz (born 22 August 1952) is a coach for Lechia Gdańsk. He is a retired Polish football player, and had a brief spell as a manager. During his career only played for Lechia Gdańsk.

Football

During his career Gładysz played for Lechia Gdańsk, making his senior debut in the 1-0 over Calisia Kalisz in 1970. In total Gładysz played a total of 231 games in all competitions, and scored 9 goals. He retired from playing in 1982, and joined the Lechia coaching staff. He was part of the coaching staff when Lechia won both the Polish Cup and the Polish SuperCup in 1983. He has held many different coaching roles for Lechia, and in 1996 became the manager of Lechia Gdańsk. His only role away from Lechia was when he was manager of Warmia Olsztyn for 4 months in 1998. After his time at Warmia, Gładysz returned to Lechia and since has mostly worked with the Lechia II team and academy.

References

1952 births
Polish football managers
Polish footballers
Lechia Gdańsk managers
Lechia Gdańsk players
Sportspeople from Gdańsk
Sportspeople from Pomeranian Voivodeship
Association football defenders
Living people